Carolina  may refer to:

Geography
 The Carolinas, the U.S. states of North and South Carolina
 North Carolina, a U.S. state
 South Carolina, a U.S. state
 Province of Carolina, a British province until 1712
 Carolina, Alabama, a town in the United States
 Carolina, North Carolina (disambiguation), multiple places
 Carolina, Rhode Island, a village that straddles the border of two towns in the U.S. state of Rhode Island
 Carolina, West Virginia
 Carolina, Puerto Rico, a municipality in the United States
 Carolina, U.S. Virgin Islands, a neighborhood
 Carolina, Maranhão, a city in Brazil
 Carolina, Mpumalanga, a town in South Africa
 Carolina, Suriname, a city
 The Carolina terrane, a geologic terrane in the southeastern United States
 Carolina, San Luis, Argentina
 Carolina, San Miguel, El Salvador
 Carolina, Santa Maria, Brazil

Music
 "Carolina" (Taylor Swift song) (2022)
 Carolina (Seu Jorge album) or Samba Esporte Fino, also a track on the album
 Carolina (Eric Church album)
 "Carolina" (state song), the state song of South Carolina
 "Carolina" (Parmalee song) (2013)
 "Caroline", a song from the album III by Espers
 "Carolina", a song from the album Everything In Between by Matt Wertz
 "Carolina", a song from the album The Golden Echo by Kimbra
 "Carolina", a song from the self-titled debut album by Harry Styles

Sports
 Carolina Marin, Spanish Badminton Player
 Carolina Dynamo of United Soccer Leagues Premier Development League
 Carolina Hurricanes of the National Hockey League
 Carolina League, a Class-A league within Minor League Baseball
 Carolina Mudcats (1991–2011), a baseball team of the Double-A Southern League
 Carolina Panthers of the National Football League
 Carolina RailHawks FC of the United Soccer League First Division
 Carolina Rollergirls of the Women's Flat Track Derby Association (WFTDA)
 Carolina Sandsharks, a professional indoor football team of the AIFA	
 Carolina Cougars (1969–1974) of the American Basketball Association

Other uses
 Carolina (name), a feminine given name and list of people with the name
 Carolina (2003 film), a 2003 film featuring Julia Stiles
 Carolina (1934 film), a film by Henry King
 Carolina (ship), a Civil War merchant ship
 Two American universities and their sports teams known colloquially as Carolina:
 University of North Carolina at Chapel Hill
 North Carolina Tar Heels
 University of South Carolina
 South Carolina Gamecocks
 Constitutio Criminalis Carolina
 Carolina (pastry), a typical pastry of Bilbao, Spain
 Carolina, a brand of rice sold by Riviana Foods, a subsidiary of Ebro Foods

See also
 Caroline (disambiguation)
 Carolinian (disambiguation)
 "Carolyna", a song by Melanie C from This Time
 Karolina (disambiguation)